Vaazhkai or Vazhkai may refer to:

 Vaazhkai (1949 film)
 Vaazhkai (1984 film)
 Vazhkai (TV series)